Dana Syslová (born November 11, 1945) is a Czech actress. She starred in the film Operace Silver A under director Jiří Strach in 2007.

References

External links

Czech film actresses
Czech television actresses
1945 births
Living people
Actresses from Prague
21st-century Czech actresses
20th-century Czech actresses
Academy of Performing Arts in Prague alumni
Czech voice actresses